
The MicC non-coding RNA (previously known as IS063 ) is located between the ompN and ydbK genes in E. coli. This Hfq-associated RNA is thought to be a regulator of the expression level of the OmpC porin protein, with a 5′ region of 22 nucleotides potentially forming an antisense interaction with the ompC mRNA. Along with MicF RNA this family may act in conjunction with EnvZ-OmpR two-component system to control the OmpF/OmpC protein ratio in response to a variety of environmental stimuli.  The expression of micC was shown to be increased in the presence of beta-lactam antibiotics.

See also 
 Two-component regulatory system

References

Further reading

External links 
 

Non-coding RNA